Dorset & Wilts 3 West was English Rugby Union league, forming part of the South West Division, for clubs based in western Dorset.  Promoted teams tended to move up to Dorset & Wilts 2 North or Dorset & Wilts 2 South depending on geographical location and there was no relegation.  The league was originally created as Berks/Dorset/Wilts 3 West in 1988 and ran until 1992 until it merged with Berks/Dorset/Wilts 3 East to form Berks/Dorset/Wilts 3.  The division would return as Dorset & Wilts 3 West in 2006.  By the end of the 2008–09 season, the league was disbanded and clubs were transferred to Dorset & Wilts 3 North or Dorset & Wilts 3 South.

Original teams
When this division was introduced in 1988 as Berks/Dorset/Wilts 3 West, it contained the following teams from Dorset and Wiltshire:

Blandford
Bridport
Plessey Christ
D.I.H.E.
Portcastrians
Warminster
Westbury

Dorset & Wilts 3 West honours

Berks/Dorset/Wilts 3 West (1988–1992)

Originally known as Berks/Dorset/Wilts 3 West and involved involving clubs based in Berkshire, Dorset and Wiltshire.  It was a tier 10 league with promotion to Berks/Dorset/Wilts 2 and there was no relegation.  At the end of the 1991–92 season Berks/Dorset/Wilts 3 West and counterpart Berks/Dorset/Wilts 3 East would merge into a single division known as Berks/Dorset/Wilts 3 (currently Dorset & Wilts 3 North and Dorset & Wilts 3 South).

Dorset & Wilts 3 West (2006–2009)

Berks/Dorset/Wilts 3 West would return as Dorset & Wilts 3 West for the 2006–07 season, this time only involving clubs based in Dorset and Wiltshire.  It was a tier 10 league with promotion to Dorset & Wilts 2 North or Dorset & Wilts 2 South and there was no relegation.  After just three seasons the division was cancelled and all clubs transferred into either Dorset & Wilts 3 North or Dorset & Wilts 3 South.

Number of league titles

Avonvale (1)
Blandford (1)
Bradford-on-Avon II (1)
Corsham II (1)
D.I.H.E. (1)
Warminster (1)
Westbury (1)

Notes

See also
Dorset & Wilts RFU
English Rugby Union Leagues
English rugby union system
Rugby union in England

References

Defunct rugby union leagues in England
Rugby union in Dorset
Rugby union in Wiltshire